Josef Allram (22 November 1860 in Schrems – 29 December 1941 in Mödling) was an Austrian writer and teacher. He studied education sciences.

Works
 Waldviertler Geschichten, 1900
 Der 1000. Patient, 1903
 Hamerling und seine Heimat, 1905
 Der letzte Trieb, 1911

External links and references
 
 
 
 https://web.archive.org/web/20140504015552/http://www.waldviertlersepp.at/geschichte/geschichte-waldv-sepp.html

1860 births
1941 deaths
Austrian male writers